Series 40, often shortened as S40, is a software platform and application user interface (UI) software on Nokia's broad range of mid-tier feature phones, as well as on some of the Vertu line of luxury phones. It was one of the world's most widely used mobile phone platforms and found in hundreds of millions of devices. Nokia announced on 25 January 2012 that the company has sold over 1.5 billion Series 40 devices. It was not used for smartphones, with Nokia turning first to Symbian, then in 2012–2017 to Windows Phone, and most recently Android. However, in 2012 and 2013, several Series 40 phones from the Asha line, such as the 308, 309 and 311, were advertised as "smartphones" although they do not actually support smartphone features like multitasking or a fully fledged HTML browser.

In 2014, Microsoft acquired Nokia's mobile phones business. As part of a licensing agreement with the company, Microsoft Mobile is allowed to use the Nokia brand on feature phones, such as the Series 40 range. However, a July 2014 company memo revealed that Microsoft would end future production of Series 40 devices. It was replaced by Series 30+.

History
Series 40 was introduced in 1999 with the release of the Nokia 7110. It had a 96 × 65 pixel monochrome display and was the first phone to come with a WAP browser. Over the years, the S40 UI evolved from a low-resolution UI to a high-resolution color UI with an enhanced graphical look. The third generation of Series 40 that became available in 2005 introduced support for devices with resolutions as high as QVGA (240×320). It is possible to customize the look and feel of the UI via comprehensive themes. In 2012, Nokia Asha mobile phones 200/201, 210, 302, 303, 305, 306, 308, 310 and 311 were released and all used Series 40. The final feature phone running Series 40 was the Nokia 515 from 2013, running the 6th Edition.

Technical information

Applications

Series 40 provides communication applications such as telephone, Internet telephony (VoIP), messaging, email client with POP3 and IMAP4 capabilities and web browser; media applications such as camera, video recorder, music/video player and FM radio; and phonebook and other personal information management (PIM) applications such as calendar and tasks. Basic file management, like in Series 60, is provided in the Applications and Gallery folders and subfolders. Gallery is also the default location for files transferred over Bluetooth to be placed. User-installed applications on Series 40 are generally mobile Java applications. Flash Lite applications are also supported, but mostly used for screensavers.

Web browser
The integrated web browser can access most web content through the service provider's XHTML/HTML gateway. The latest version of Series 40, called Series 40 6th Edition, introduced a new browser based on the WebKit open source components WebCore and JavaScriptCore. The new browser delivers support for HTML 4.01, CSS2, JavaScript 1.5, and Ajax. Also, like the higher-end Series 60, Series 40 can run the UC Browser web browser to enhance the user's web browsing experience. The latest feature phones from the Asha lineup come with the Nokia Xpress Browser which uses proxy servers to compress and optimize web pages in a similar fashion as Opera Mini.

Synchronization
Support for SyncML synchronization of the address book, calendar and notes with external services is present. However, with many S40 phones, these synchronization settings must be sent via an OTA text message.

Software platform
Series 40 is an embedded software platform that is open for software development via standard or de facto content and application development technologies. It supports Java MIDlets, i.e. Java MIDP and CLDC technology, which provide location, communication, messaging, media, and graphics capabilities. S40 also supports Flash Lite applications.

List of devices
The following is a list of Series 40 devices released by Nokia:
 Nokia 1xxx series
 Nokia 1680 classic
 Nokia 2xxx series
 Nokia 2220 slide
 Nokia 2320 classic
 Nokia 2323 classic
 Nokia 2330 classic
 Nokia 2355
 Nokia 2600 classic
 Nokia 2610
 Nokia 2626
 Nokia 2630
 Nokia 2650
 Nokia 2660
 Nokia 2680 slide
 Nokia 2690
 Nokia 2700 classic
 Nokia 2710
 Nokia 2720 fold
 Nokia 2730 classic
 Nokia 2760
 Nokia 2855
 Nokia 2855i
 Nokia 2865
 Nokia 2865i
 Nokia 3xxx series
 Nokia 3100
 Nokia 3105
 Nokia 3108
 Nokia 3109 classic
 Nokia 3110 classic
 Nokia 3110 Evolve
 Nokia 3120
 Nokia 3120 classic
 Nokia 3125
 Nokia 3128
 Nokia 3152
 Nokia 3155
 Nokia 3155i
 Nokia 3200
 Nokia 3205
 Nokia 3220
 Nokia 3300
 Nokia 3300 Americas
 Nokia 3500 classic
 Nokia 3510i
 Nokia 3530
 Nokia 3555
 Nokia 3585i
 Nokia 3586
 Nokia 3586i
 Nokia 3587
 Nokia 3587i
 Nokia 3595
 Nokia 3600 slide
 Nokia 3610
 Nokia 3710 fold
 Nokia 3720 classic
 Nokia 5xxx series
 Nokia 5000
 Nokia 5070
 Nokia 5100
 Nokia 5130 XpressMusic
 Nokia 5140
 Nokia 5140i
 Nokia 5200
 Nokia 5220 XpressMusic
 Nokia 5300 XpressMusic
 Nokia 5310 XpressMusic
 Nokia 5330 XpressMusic
 Nokia 5330 Mobile TV Edition
 Nokia 5610 XpressMusic
 Nokia 6xxx series
 Nokia 6010
 Nokia 6012
 Nokia 6015
 Nokia 6015i
 Nokia 6020
 Nokia 6021
 Nokia 6030
 Nokia 6060
 Nokia 6070
 Nokia 6080
 Nokia 6085
 Nokia 6086
 Nokia 6100
 Nokia 6101
 Nokia 6102
 Nokia 6102i
 Nokia 6103
 Nokia 6108
 Nokia 6111
 Nokia 6125
 Nokia 6126
 Nokia 6131
 Nokia 6131 NFC
 Nokia 6133
 Nokia 6136
 Nokia 6151
 Nokia 6152
 Nokia 6155
 Nokia 6155i
 Nokia 6165
 Nokia 6170
 Nokia 6200
 Nokia 6208 classic
 Nokia 6212 classic
 Nokia 6216 classic
 Nokia 6220
 Nokia 6225
 Nokia 6230
 Nokia 6230i
 Nokia 6233
 Nokia 6234
 Nokia 6235
 Nokia 6235i
 Nokia 6255
 Nokia 6260 slide
 Nokia 6263
 Nokia 6265
 Nokia 6265i
 Nokia 6267
 Nokia 6270
 Nokia 6275
 Nokia 6275i
 Nokia 6280
 Nokia 6282
 Nokia 6288
 Nokia 6300
 Nokia 6300i
 Nokia 6301
 Nokia 6303 classic
 Nokia 6303i classic
 Nokia 6350
 Nokia 6500 classic
 Nokia 6500 slide
 Nokia 6555
 Nokia 6585
 Nokia 6560
 Nokia 6600 fold
 Nokia 6600 slide
 Nokia 6600i
 Nokia 6610
 Nokia 6610i
 Nokia 6750 Mural
 Nokia 6800
 Nokia 6810
 Nokia 6820
 Nokia 6822
 Nokia 7xxx series:
 Nokia 7020
 Nokia 7100 Supernova
 Nokia 7200
 Nokia 7210
 Nokia 7210 Supernova
 Nokia 7230
 Nokia 7250
 Nokia 7260
 Nokia 7270
 Nokia 7280
 Nokia 7310 Supernova
 Nokia 7360
 Nokia 7370
 Nokia 7373
 Nokia 7380
 Nokia 7390
 Nokia 7500 Prism
 Nokia 7510 Supernova
 Nokia 7600
 Nokia 7610 Supernova
 Crystal Prism
 Nokia 8xxx series
 Nokia 8600 Luna
 Nokia 8800
 Nokia 8800 Sirocco
 Nokia 8800 Arte
 Nokia 8800 Sapphire Arte
 Nokia 8800 Carbon Arte
 Nokia Cseries:
 Nokia C1-01
 Nokia C1-02
 Nokia C2-00
 Nokia C2-01
 Nokia C2-02
 Nokia C2-03
 Nokia C2-05
 Nokia C2-06
 Nokia C3-00
 Nokia C3-01
 Nokia Xseries(Not to be confused with Nokia X Family):
 Nokia X2-00
 Nokia X2-01
 Nokia X2-02
 Nokia X3-00
 Nokia X3-02
 Nokia Asha series
 Nokia Asha 200/201
 Nokia Asha 202
 Nokia Asha 203
 Nokia Asha 205
 Nokia Asha 210
 Nokia Asha 300
 Nokia Asha 302
 Nokia Asha 303
 Nokia Asha 305
 Nokia Asha 306
 Nokia Asha 308
 Nokia Asha 309
 Nokia Asha 310
 Nokia Asha 311

See also
 Nokia X platform
 Series 20
 Series 30
 Series 30+
 Series 60
 Series 80
 Series 90

References

External links

Nokia platforms
Mobile software
Embedded operating systems
Mobile operating systems
Computer-related introductions in 1999